Tatsuo Osako (大迫 辰雄 Ōsako Tatsuo; 1917–2003), of Chiba, Japan was a citizen of the Japanese Empire during World War II who is most notable for transporting Jews to safety. He escorted over 2,000 Jews who came from German-occupied countries from Vladivostok, Russia to Tsuruga, Japan. Many of them continued from Japan on to the United States. These refugees had transit visas issued by Chiune Sugihara, who is often referred to as the Japanese Schindler.

Osako's work and a photo album he kept of refugees he helped inspired his co-worker, Akira Kitade, to write a book about Japanese people helping Jews escape from the Nazis titled "Visas of life and the epic journey: how the Sugihara survivors reached Japan". He died in 2003.

See also 
 Chiune Sugihara
Setsuzo Kotsuji

References

External links
 Article about Tatsuo Osako

Japanese people of World War II
People from Chiba Prefecture
1917 births
2003 deaths
Jewish Japanese history
People who rescued Jews during the Holocaust